The Books Council of Wales (previously known as the Welsh Books Council) is a literature advocacy organisation in Wales. It was established in 1961, and today it is funded by the Welsh Government. The council's aims are to promote the interests of Welsh language books and English language books of interest to Wales, to promote the publishing industry, and to assist and support authors by offering a number of services and distributing grants. It offers design and editorial services for publishers, distributes grants for authors and publishers, and provides services for libraries.

The council's headquarters are in the former St Mary's College building in Castell Brychan, Aberystwyth; and it also has a distribution centre on the outskirts of the town at Glanyrafon Enterprise Park. It employs 40 permanent staff between both locations. The distribution centre has an annual turnover of around £3 million (net).

Alun Creunant Davies held the position of director from 1965 to 1987.

The current Chief Executive is Helgard Krause.

References

External links 

 Welsh Books Council's online book store

Council
Council
1961 establishments in Wales
Organisations based in Aberystwyth
Books Council
Welsh culture
Celtic language advocacy organizations